Republican Army can refer to:
Irish Republican Army, a military organisation descended from the Irish Volunteers
Baloch Republican Army, a Baloch nationalist guerrilla army in Balochistan
Spanish Republican Army, the army of the Second Spanish Republic